Hugo Critchley is a British professor of psychiatry at Brighton and Sussex Medical School, a partnership of the University of Brighton and the University of Sussex.

Early life and education 

Critchley spent childhood years in Blackburn, Lancashire.  His father, Edmund Critchley, worked as a neurologist, and his mother, Mair Critchley, née Bowen, as a physician in nuclear medicine.  Critchley went to the University of Liverpool, attaining degrees in Physiology (BSc 1987) and Medicine (MB ChB 1990).  After a period as a junior doctor in Walton and Fazakerley Hospitals, he pursued doctorate training, studying cross-modal sensory processing in the prefrontal cortex at the Department of Experimental Psychology University of Oxford (DPhil 1996).

In 1995, Critchley entered training in psychiatry at St George's Hospital and then Kings College Institute of Psychiatry (now IoPPN), where he began using neuroimaging methods.  In 1998, he moved to UCL Queen Square Institute of Neurology to pursue research on mind-brain-body interactions, working between the Functional Imaging Laboratory (Wellcome Department of Imaging Neuroscience) and the clinical Autonomic Unit at the National Hospital for Neurology and Neurosurgery.  He completed his general training as a neuropsychiatrist in 2003 and gained a Wellcome Trust Senior Fellowship in Clinical Science in 2004.

Career 

Critchley was a principal at the Wellcome Department of Imaging Neuroscience and group leader at the UCL Institute of Cognitive Neuroscience, before he was appointed Foundation Chair in Psychiatry at Brighton and Sussex Medical School in 2006.  Critchley is Co-Director (with Anil Seth) of the Sackler Centre for Consciousness Science, and heads the Brighton and Sussex Medical School Department of Neuroscience.  In 2013, Critchley was the recipient of an Advance Grant from the European Research Council. Clinically, Critchley helped established a service for adult neurodevelopmental conditions at the Sussex Partnership NHS Foundation Trust, where he works as a psychiatrist.

Publications 

Critchley's research focuses primarily on mind-body-brain interactions.  He has published widely on emotion, autonomic psychophysiology, interoception, and psychiatric symptoms. His most cited article has been cited 2994 times, according to Google Scholar.

Contributions and recognition 

Critchley is involved in the Academic Faculty of the Royal College of Psychiatrists, and he has previously served as a member of the Council of the American Psychosomatic Society.  In 2006, he received the Neal Miller award from the Academy of Behavioral Medicine.  In 2015, Critchley became a fellow of the Royal College of Psychiatrists and, in 2017, he received the Paul D MacLean Award from the American Psychosomatic Society.

References

External links 
 Brighton and Sussex Medical School Neuroscience
 Sackler Centre for Consciousness Science

Year of birth missing (living people)
Living people
British neuroscientists
Alumni of the University of Oxford
Academics of the University of Sussex